Pablo Andrés Tamburrini Bravo (born 30 January 1990) is a Palestinian footballer who currently plays for Deportes Valdivia of the Segunda División Profesional de Chile.

International career
Tamburrini was born and raised in Chile to Chilean parents with Palestinian ancestry. He was called up to the Palestine national football team internationally, making his debut in the 2018 World Cup qualification match against Saudi Arabia in June 2015, and scored his first international goal in a 3–2 defeat.

International goals
Score and Result columns list Palestine's goals first.

References

External links
 
 

1990 births
Living people
Footballers from Santiago
Citizens of the State of Palestine through descent
Palestinian footballers
Palestine international footballers
Palestinian people of Chilean descent
Chilean footballers
San Antonio Unido footballers
Municipal La Pintana footballers
Club Deportivo Palestino footballers
Santiago Wanderers footballers
San Luis de Quillota footballers
Shabab Al-Bireh Institute players
Lautaro de Buin footballers
Deportes Valdivia footballers
Chilean Primera División players
West Bank Premier League players
Segunda División Profesional de Chile players
Chilean people of Palestinian descent
Association football midfielders
2019 AFC Asian Cup players
People from Santiago
People from Santiago Province, Chile
People from Santiago Metropolitan Region